Holy Trinity Russian Orthodox Church is a Russian Orthodox church in Mebane, North Carolina. It is one of three Russian Orthodox churches in North Carolina.

History 
Holy Trinity is part of the Eastern American Diocese of the Russian Orthodox Church Outside Russia. The congregation was formed in 1991 before purchasing a small carpenter's shop off of U.S. Highway 70 in Mebane. The current church was opened in 2007.

References

Churches in Mebane, North Carolina
Eastern Orthodox churches in North Carolina
Russian Orthodox church buildings in the United States